Jingshan Subdistrict is a subdistrict in Dongcheng District, Beijing, China. It contains 8 communities. The subdistrict has a total area of 1.64 squared kilometers, and as of 2020, it has a population of 25,374.

The subdistrict received its current name from the Jingshan Park that is located inside the subdistrict.

History

Administrative Divisions 
The table below lists the 8 communities under Jingshan as of 2021:

See also 
List of township-level divisions of Beijing

References

Dongcheng District, Beijing
Subdistricts of Beijing